The Kendall test may refer to:
Kendall tau rank correlation coefficient, also called the Kendall tau test
A test of the strength of the abdominal muscles during a physical examination